is a Japanese manga series written and illustrated by Setona Mizushiro. The Cornered Mouse Dreams of Cheese was serialized in the  manga magazine Judy from 2005 to 2006. The book was followed up with a one-volume sequel titled .

A live-action film adapting both The Cornered Mouse Dreams of Cheese and The Carp on the Chopping Block Jumps Twice was released on September 11, 2020.

Plot

The Cornered Mouse Dreams of Cheese
Kyouichi Ootomo, an indecisive and passive office worker, runs into his college underclassmen, Wataru Imagase. Imagase reveals that he was hired by Kyouichi's wife, Chikako, to investigate his infidelity, but he also confesses that he is gay and has been in love with Kyouichi for a long time. He promises not to reveal anything in exchange for a kiss. Kyouichi agrees to the tryst, hoping it will save his marriage, but their secret relationship begins to escalate and eventually becomes sexual. Eventually, Chikako reveals to Kyouichi that she planned on divorcing him and only hired Imagase to get a higher settlement. Kyouichi also learns that Imagase had kept his promise not to reveal his cheating on her.

Shortly after Kyouichi and Chikako separate, Imagase breaks up with his boyfriend and begins living in Kyouichi's apartment. As the two grow closer, Kyouichi begins spending less time with women and realizes he is becoming attracted to Imagase. At his university reunion party, Kyouichi reconnects with his ex-girlfriend, Natsuki, who becomes interested in renewing their relationship. While Kyouichi remains unsure as to whether he wants a life with Imagase or return to dating women, Natsuki, however, discovers his relationship with Imagase when she takes him home after a night of drinking. To settle their confrontation, Imagase and Natsuki force him to choose. Kyouichi picks Natsuki, believing he could never be in a homosexual relationship. After the two sleep together, both Kyouichi and Natsuki realize that Kyouichi's feelings for Imagase remain strong and they break up. Two months later, Kyouichi finds Imagase in town and the two reconcile.

The Carp on the Chopping Block Jumps Twice

Kyouichi is promoted to section manager at his job, and he learns that his assistant, Tamaki Okamura, is interested in him. He later learns that Tamaki is the daughter of his superior, Yanagida, and is offered to be set up in a relationship with her. As Kyouichi and Tamaki become more deeply acquainted, especially after Yanagida's death, Imagase becomes increasingly insecure and decides to end the relationship himself. After Imagase moves out of Kyouichi's apartment, Kyouichi and Tamaki begin dating.

Later, while on an assignment, Imagase spots Tamaki going to a gynecologist and notices that she is being stalked by his target, but he is too late in stopping him, resulting in Tamaki falling down a flight of stairs. At the hospital, Kyouichi reunites with Imagase, and Imagase begs him to let him be in his life, to which he rejects. Before Imagase leaves, Kyouichi confesses about his frustrations with him and admits their relationship has been dysfunctional. The two make up, and Kyouichi ends his relationship with Tamaki, to which he is met with scorn from their co-worker. After he turns to Imagase, the two decide to live together again, uncertain about what their future may bring.

Characters

 (drama CD); portrayed by: Tadayoshi Okura (film)
Kyouichi is an indecisive office worker who is 29 years old.

 (drama CD); portrayed by: Ryo Narita (film)
Imagase is a 27-year-old private investigator who attended the same college as Kyouichi. He has been in love with him for years, and, when assigned to investigate him, takes the opportunity to act out on his feelings.

 (drama CD); portrayed by: Miyu Sakihi (film)
Chikako is Kyouichi's wife who has long been dissatisfied with their marriage and uses Kyouichi's earnings to buy new things. After years of a troubled marriage, she leaves him and initially hires Imagase to investigate Kyouichi's infidelity to secure a higher settlement from their divorce.

 (drama CD); portrayed by: Honami Satō (film)
Natsuki is Kyouichi's ex-girlfriend from college.

 (drama CD); portrayed by: Shiori Yoshida (film)
Tamaki is a kind-hearted office worker and the daughter of Kyouichi's boss, who falls in love with Kyouichi.

Media

Manga

The Cornered Mouse Dreams of Cheese is written and illustrated by Setona Mizushiro. It was serialized in the manga magazine Judy from 2005 to 2006. The chapters were later released in one bound volume by Shogakukan under the Judy Comics imprint.

The series was followed up with a one-volume sequel titled , which was published in Judy in 2006 and was later transferred to Mobile Flowers after Judy became defunct. To coincide with the bound volume release of The Carp on the Chopping Block Jumps Twice, The Cornered Mouse Dreams of Cheese was re-released on May 8, 2009 with a new illustrated cover and under the Flower Comics Alpha imprint after the Judy Comics imprint became defunct. A drama CD adaptation was released on February 27, 2008.

Reprintings of The Cornered Mouse Dreams of Cheese and The Carp on the Chopping Block Jumps Twice removed explicit sexual content beginning January 28, 2020 in order to appeal to a younger demographic with the release of the 2020 live-action film adaptation. The cover of the volumes will remain the same, making them indistinguishable from previous printings. Edited versions of the first and bonus chapters of The Cornered Mouse Dreams of Cheese, "Kissing Gourami" and "Hummingbird Rhapsody", were reprinted in the March 2020 issue of Flowers. An omnibus volume of the edited versions was released on April 10, 2020.

In January 2019, Seven Seas Entertainment announced that they were distributing both books in English.

Film

In February 2019, a live-action film adaptation for The Cornered Mouse Dreams of Cheese and The Carp on the Chopping Block Jumps Twice was announced and slated for a release on June 5, 2020, but was postponed to September 11, 2020 due to the COVID-19 pandemic. The film is directed by Isao Yukisada with screenplay by Anne Horiizumi. It stars Tadayoshi Okura as Kyouichi and Ryo Narita as Imagase.

Reception

Keiko Takemiya praised the series for being an "amazing boys' love [story]", particularly in The Carp on the Chopping Block Jumps Twice. Shigeko Matsuo from Asahi Shimbun also praised it for exploring Kyouichi's inner conflict on love through shoulder angel and devil versions of himself, White Kyouichi and Black Kyouichi. The Carp on the Chopping Block Jumps Twice also received many 5-star reviews on Amazon Japan upon release. Rebecca Silverman of Anime News Network noted that there was a "harshness" and "anger" in the explicit scenes that were "interesting", and that there was an "overall turbulent tone" that keeps the story "uncomfortable." Upon revisiting the manga, columnists at both Anime News Network and The Japan Times criticized its use outdated tropes, particularly in regards to how Kyouichi and Imagase's relationship was founded on blackmail, as well as views on homosexuality and bisexuality.

The live-action film adaptation debuted at #5 on its opening week. James Hadfield gave the film 2 out of 5 stars, praising Anne Horiizumi's script for removing the homophobic slurs found in the original manga; however, he criticized the film for removing some of the characters' internal dialogue, making the characters' intentions hard to understand as a result, as well as the new "ambivalent" ending created specifically for the film. James Marsh from the South China Morning Post gave the film 1 out of 5 stars, citing the performances as "awkward actors going through the motions" and that neither Kyouichi nor Imagase were "remotely sympathetic." Ryo Narita won the Best Male Supporting Actor at the 62nd Blue Ribbon Awards for his portrayal of Imagase in 2020. He was also nominated at the 75th Mainichi Film Awards and the 44th Japan Academy Film Prize.

Notes

References

External links
 Official film adaptation website
 

Boys' love films
Japanese radio dramas
Josei manga
LGBT in anime and manga
Manga adapted into films
Romance anime and manga
Seven Seas Entertainment titles
Shogakukan manga
Yaoi anime and manga
2000s LGBT literature
Films postponed due to the COVID-19 pandemic
Japanese romantic drama films
Japanese LGBT-related films
2020 films
2020 LGBT-related films
LGBT-related romantic drama films